Expedition of Bashir Ibn Sad al-Ansari may refer to:

Expedition of Bashir ibn Sad al-Anṣari (Yemen), February 628 AD, 10th month 7AH
Expedition of Bashir ibn Sad al-Anṣari (Fadak), December 628 AD, 3rd month of 7AH